Pickwick Landing Dam is a hydroelectric dam on the Tennessee River in Hardin County, in the U.S. state of Tennessee.  The dam is one of nine dams on the river owned and operated by the Tennessee Valley Authority, which built the dam in the 1930s as part of a New Deal-era initiative to create a continuous navigation channel between the river's mouth and Knoxville, and bring economic development to the area.  The dam impounds the  Pickwick Lake and its tailwaters are part of Kentucky Lake.

Pickwick Landing Dam is named for a community situated near the dam site at the time of construction.  The community had been named after the title character in the Charles Dickens novel, The Pickwick Papers.

Location

This stretch of the river is also a geological boundary between the scattered hills of the Western Highland Rim to the northeast and the flatlands of West Tennessee to the northwest.  

Most of the land just south of the dam and its immediate lakeshore is part of Pickwick Landing State Park, and Shiloh National Military Park is located a few miles to the north. The area around Pickwick Landing Dam is sparsely populated, the nearest community of note being the small community of Counce, Tennessee two (2) miles to the southwest. Tennessee State Route 128 crosses the top of the dam, connecting the area to Savannah to the north.

Capacity

Background and construction

Throughout the 19th century, a series of river rapids known as the Muscle Shoals (in northern Alabama) were a major impediment to navigation along the Tennessee River and effectively isolated the upper stretches of the river (namely Knoxville and Chattanooga) from the nation's major inland waterways.  The construction of Wilson Dam by the U.S. Army Corps of Engineers in the 1920s and the construction of Wheeler Dam by the Tennessee Valley Authority in the 1930s flooded a large section of the shoals, but serious obstacles still remained between Riverton and Florence, especially in the vicinity of Tuscumbia.  

As Wheeler Dam neared completion in 1935, TVA knew a third dam would be necessary to connect the reservoirs at Muscle Shoals with the lower part of the river.  Several private entities had investigated the possibility of building a dam at Parker's Landing (a few miles upstream from Pickwick), but the Corps of Engineers— which had surveyed the area in the 1920s— suggested TVA build a dam at Pickwick Landing. The Pickwick Landing project was authorized on November 19, 1934, and work began in March 1935.

Parts of Riverton and Waterloo, Alabama were flooded. The residents of the latter demanded TVA purchase the whole town, claiming the reservoir would destroy property values, but TVA declined, citing a study that suggested the reservoir would not have a serious or detrimental impact on the town's economy. Pickwick Landing Dam's original turbines were among the largest propeller-type turbines in the world at the time in which they were installed.

Pickwick Landing Dam was completed and the gates closed on February 8, 1938, although dredge work continued until 1941.  The first generator went online in August 1938.  The lock was designed by the Corps of Engineers, and its  lift was among the highest in the world when the lock became operational on February 19, 1938.  Pickwick Landing Dam was constructed at a cost of just over $45 million.

See also

Dams and reservoirs of the Tennessee River
List of crossings of the Tennessee River

References

External links

 TVA: Pickwick Reservoir

Dams on the Tennessee River
Dams in Tennessee
Bridges over the Tennessee River
Buildings and structures in Hardin County, Tennessee
Hydroelectric power plants in Tennessee
Tennessee Valley Authority dams
Dams completed in 1938
Energy infrastructure completed in 1938
1938 establishments in Tennessee
Road bridges in Tennessee